The Graz Chamber Philharmonic is a professional Austrian orchestra.

History 
The Graz Chamber Philharmonic was founded in 2001 by Achim Holub and developed into one of the most renowned Austrian chamber orchestras. It performed many times in Styria, Carinthia as well as the Burgenland and appeared at different festivals. Moreover, the orchestra played with known soloists such as Johanna Beisteiner and the British pianist Nick van Bloss. The orchestra no longer exists.

References

External links
Offician Website of Graz Chamber Philharmonic.
Official Website of Achim Holub.

Austrian orchestras
Musical groups established in 2001